PZA may refer to:

 Pyrazinamide, a medication used to treat tuberculosis
 PZA Loara, a Polish armored radar-directed self-propelled anti-aircraft gun system
 PZA, the station code for Pazhavanthangal railway station, Chennai, Tamil Nadu, India